Leslie Pope (June 2, 1954 – May 6, 2020) was an American set decorator who was nominated at the 76th Academy Awards for her work on the 2003 film Seabiscuit in the category of Best Art Direction. She shared her nomination with Jeannine Oppewall.

Pope was born in Bowling Green, Kentucky. She was an alumna of Antioch College, where she received a B.A. in biology.

Selected filmography

 After Hours (1985)
 Angel Heart (1987)
 Ironweed (1987)
 Crocodile Dundee II (1988)
 The Prince of Tides (1991)
 Carlito's Way (1993)
 The Juror (1996)
 Donnie Brasco (1997)
 In & Out (1997)
 The Astronaut's Wife (1999)
 Flawless (1999)
 The Family Man (2000)
 Bad Company (2002)
 Catch Me If You Can (2002)
 S1m0ne (2002)
 Seabiscuit (2003)
 Spanglish (2004)
 Failure to Launch (2006)
 Lions for Lambs (2007)
 Spider-Man 3 (2007)
 Seven Pounds (2008)
 Funny People (2009)
 Get Him to the Greek (2010)
 The Amazing Spider-Man (2012)
 Django Unchained (2012)
 This Is 40 (2012)
 Captain America: The Winter Soldier (2014)
 Ant-Man (2015)
 Ghostbusters (2016)
 Avengers: Infinity War (2018)
 Avengers: Endgame (2019)

References

External links
 

1954 births
2020 deaths
American set decorators
Antioch College alumni
People from Bowling Green, Kentucky
Set decorators